Timothy H. O'Sullivan (c. 1840 – January 14, 1882) was a photographer widely known for his work related to the American Civil War and the Western United States.

Biography
O'Sullivan's history and personal life remains unclear as there is little information to work from. For example, he was either born in Ireland and came to New York City two years later with his parents or his parents traveled to New York before he was born. There is no way of finding out which of the two stories is true. We do know that as a teenager, he was employed by Mathew Brady, a photographer who also became known for his Civil War photographs.

We also know when the Civil War began in early 1861, he was commissioned a first lieutenant in the Union Army (though Joel Snyder, O'Sullivan's biographer, could find no definitive proof of this claim in Army records). There is no record of him fighting. Alexander Gardner worked as a photographer on the staff of General George B. McClellan, commander of the Army of the Potomac, and was given the honorary rank of captain. Gardner described O'Sullivan as the "Superintendent of my map and field work." Biographer James D. Horan writes that O'Sullivan was a civilian photographer attached to the Topographical Engineers. His job was to copy maps and plans, but he also took photographs on his own time. Although he later listed himself as a first lieutenant, the rank was likely honorary, like Gardner's. From November 1861 through April 1862, O'Sullivan, working for Gardner, followed Union forces to Fort Walker, Fort Beauregard, Beaufort, Hilton Head, and Fort Pulaski.

After being honorably discharged, he rejoined Brady's team. In July 1862, O'Sullivan followed Maj. Gen. John Pope's Northern Virginia Campaign. By joining Gardner's studio, he had his forty-four photographs published in the first Civil War photographs collection, Gardner's Photographic Sketch Book of the War. In July 1863, he created his most famous photograph, "The Harvest of Death," depicting dead soldiers from the Battle of Gettysburg.

He took many other photographs documenting the battle, including "Dead Confederate sharpshooter at foot of Little Round Top", "Field where General Reynolds fell",  "View in wheatfield opposite our extreme left", "Confederate dead gathered for burial at the southwestern edge of the Rose woods", "Bodies of Federal soldiers near the McPherson woods", "Slaughter pen", and others.

In 1864, following Gen. Ulysses S. Grant's trail, he photographed the Siege of Petersburg before briefly heading to North Carolina to document the siege of Fort Fisher. That brought him to the Appomattox Court House, the site of Robert E. Lee's surrender in April 1865.

From 1867 to 1869, he was the official photographer on the United States Geological Exploration of the Fortieth Parallel under Clarence King. The expedition began at Virginia City, Nevada, where he photographed the mines, and worked eastward. In so doing, he became one of the pioneers in the field of geophotography. In contrast to the Asian and Eastern landscape fronts, the subject matter he focused on was a new concept.  It involved taking pictures of nature as an untamed, pre-industrialized land without the use of landscape painting conventions. O'Sullivan combined science and art, making exact records of extraordinary beauty.

In 1870 he joined a survey team in Panama to survey for a canal across the isthmus. From 1871 to 1874 he returned to the southwestern United States to join Lt. George M. Wheeler in his survey west of the 100th meridian. His job was to photograph the West to attract settlers. O'Sullivan's pictures were among the first to record the prehistoric ruins, Navajo weavers, and pueblo villages of the Southwest. He faced starvation on the Colorado River when some of the expedition's boats capsized; few of the 300 negatives he took survived the trip back East.  He spent the last years of his short life in Washington, D.C., as official photographer for the U.S. Geological Survey and the Treasury Department.

O'Sullivan died in Staten Island of tuberculosis at age 42.

In 1986 O'Sullivan was inducted into the International Photography Hall of Fame and Museum.

Gallery of O'Sullivan photographs

References

Sources

 
 Frassanito, William A. Early Photography at Gettysburg. Gettysburg, PA: Thomas Publications, 1995. .
 Biography of Timothy H. O'Sullivan from The Getty Museum
 The Life of Timothy H. O'Sullivan from the Tucson Weekly, March 31, 2003 by Margaret Regan. Accessed July 29, 2010.

Further reading

External links

Timothy O'Sullivan gallery at The Atlantic
Four Southwestern photos at Phoebe A. Hearst Museum of Anthropology
American Treasures (LOC)
Western Development, The Wall Street Journal, 30 March 2010
Encyclopædia Britannica

19th-century American journalists
19th-century American photographers
American male journalists
War photographers
United States Geological Survey personnel
American people of Irish descent
Photographers from New York City
People of New York (state) in the American Civil War
19th-century deaths from tuberculosis
Year of birth uncertain
1840s births
1882 deaths
Scientists from New York (state)
Tuberculosis deaths in New York (state)